Pseudoterpna lesuraria is a moth of the family Geometridae first described by Daniel Lucas in 1933. It is found in Morocco.

References

Moths described in 1933
Pseudoterpnini